Louis Tapardjuk (born January 30, 1953 in an igloo northwest of Igloolik, Nunavut, Canada) was the Member of the Legislative Assembly (MLA) for the electoral district of Amittuq from 2004 to 2013, having won the seat in the 2004 Nunavut election. He served in the Executive Council of Nunavut the Minister of Finance and Minister of Culture, Language, Elders and Youth (CLEY).

Prior to becoming an MLA in the Legislative Assembly of Nunavut Tapardjuk was mayor of Igloolik and served as a board member of the Tunngavik Federation of Nunavut.

In January 2009, Taparadjuk was demoted as Minister of Justice due to comments that he made concerning the mutuality of domestic violence between men and women.  In an e-mail message dated January 21, 2009, Taparadjuk wrote:  "Often, in cases of domestic disputes, both parties share the blame, but according to the criminal code, the person who gets physical is charged, even though the other party may have initiated the conflict. Often the male is charged even though the conflict may have been initiated by the female partner."

Three days after Taparadjuk's e-mail was sent, Premier Eva Aariak removed him as Minister of Justice, saying, "This government does not condone violence against women or men in any way, for any reason, which the line seems to imply."

Source: 1 and 2

External links
. Biography at the Legislative Assembly of Nunavut

1953 births
Living people
Inuit from the Northwest Territories
Inuit politicians
People from Igloolik
Members of the Legislative Assembly of Nunavut
21st-century Canadian politicians
Mayors of places in Nunavut
Inuit from Nunavut